International Trail Running Association (ITRA) is the governing body for trail running.  It was formed in 2013, emerging from the 1st International Trail Running Conference held in 2012. Trail running was first recognised by the International Association of Athletics Federations (now World Athletics) in 2015 as a discipline of athletics.

See also
 International Association of Ultrarunners (IAU)

References

External links
 

Trail running
Sport in the Alps